Cindy Solangie Delgado Buitrago (born November 9, 1989) is a Colombian rugby sevens player. She plays for Colombia women's national rugby sevens team and was a member of the squad for the 2015 Pan American Games. She has been selected to be part of Colombia's women's sevens team to the 2016 Summer Olympics in Brazil.

References

External links 
 

1989 births
Living people
Female rugby sevens players
Rugby sevens players at the 2015 Pan American Games
Rugby sevens players at the 2016 Summer Olympics
Colombia international rugby sevens players
Olympic rugby sevens players of Colombia
Central American and Caribbean Games gold medalists for Colombia
Competitors at the 2018 Central American and Caribbean Games
Central American and Caribbean Games medalists in rugby sevens
Pan American Games competitors for Colombia
Colombia international women's rugby sevens players
21st-century Colombian women